Kimi wa 100% (君は100%) is the thirty-first single by the Japanese Pop-rock band Porno Graffitti. It was released on October 27, 2010.

Track listing

References

2010 singles
Porno Graffitti songs
SME Records singles
2010 songs